Croucher is a surname. Notable people with the surname include:

 Brian Croucher (born 1942), English actor and director
 Mel Croucher, British entrepreneur and video game pioneer
 Norman Croucher, British mountain climber
 Terence Croucher, British composer and performer

See also
 Cross (surname)
 Crouch (surname)

English-language surnames